Georg Bayerer (9 April 1915 – 6 June 1998) was a German footballer and coach.

References

1915 births
1998 deaths
Association football goalkeepers
German footballers
TSV 1860 Munich players
FC Bayern Munich footballers
German football managers
1. FSV Mainz 05 managers
FC Bayern Munich managers
Stuttgarter Kickers managers
SSV Jahn Regensburg managers